The Irish Union of Hairdressers and Allied Workers was a trade union in the United Kingdom representing hairdressers, barbers, and hairdressers assistants. It merged with the Transport and General Workers' Union in 1969.

See also
 List of trade unions
 Transport and General Workers' Union
 TGWU amalgamations

References

Defunct trade unions of the United Kingdom
Defunct trade unions of Ireland
Hairdressers' trade unions
Trade unions disestablished in 1969
Transport and General Workers' Union amalgamations